Jack Wade may refer to:

 Jack Wade (footballer) (1907–1941), Australian rules footballer
 Jack Wade (James Bond), a character in two James Bond films
 Jack Wade, Alaska, an unincorporated community

See also 
 John Wade (disambiguation)

Wade, Jack